Tempo! Tempo! is a 1929 German silent adventure film directed by Max Obal and starring Luciano Albertini, Trude Berliner and Oreste Bilancia. It was shot at the Staaken Studios in Berlin and on location on the Italian Riviera. The film's art direction was by Botho Hoefer and Hans Minzloff.

Cast
In alphabetical order
 Luciano Albertini as Lilso Lagard 
 Trude Berliner as Mila  
 Oreste Bilancia as Luigi Vespa  
 Fritz Kampers as Jolly Baker  
 Hermann Picha as Tito Tartini  
 Arthur Reppert as Pit  
 Hilda Rosch as Imogen Robinson  
 Angelo Rossi as Orge  
 Johannes Roth as Pot

References

Bibliography
 Bock, Hans-Michael & Bergfelder, Tim. The Concise CineGraph. Encyclopedia of German Cinema. Berghahn Books, 2009.

External links

1929 films
Films of the Weimar Republic
Films directed by Max Obal
German silent feature films
German black-and-white films
Films shot at Staaken Studios
1929 adventure films
German adventure films